Bannbadinnka is a small human settlement in southwestern Mali that sits along the RN22 highway and contains 161 buildings within its jurisdiction.

References 

Populated places in Kayes Region